Naked eye is a figure of speech referring to visual perception.

Naked eye may also refer to:

 Naked Eye (magazine), a Canadian pop culture quarterly
 "Naked Eye" (Luscious Jackson song), 1996
 "Naked Eye" (The Who song), 1974
 The Naked Eye (1956 film), a 1956 documentary film nominated for an Academy Award
 The Naked Eye (1998 film), a 1998 Spanish film
 The Naked Eye, a book by Desmond Morris

See also
 Naked Eyes
 Naked-eye planet